Alf Kjetil Walgermo (born 1977) is a Norwegian writer and former chairman of the Norwegian Critics' Association. He has often written on Christian subjects and served as cultural editor of the moderate Christian paper Vårt Land.

References 

Norwegian journalists
Norwegian literary critics
1977 births
Living people